Horace Baldwin (18011850) was mayor of Houston, Texas in 1844. His brother-in-law, Augustus Chapman Allen, was a co-founder of Houston, Texas.

A former resident of Baldwinsville, New York, Baldwin came to Houston based on the encouragement of his sister, Charlotte Baldwin Allen. By 1840, he owned substantial real estate in  Harris County and the city of Houston. In 1843 he was elected to serve as an alderman of the Fourth Ward and the next year he served as mayor of Houston. 

A daughter, Eliazbeth Baldwin, married William Marsh Rice.

References

1798 births
1850 deaths
Burials at Glenwood Cemetery (Houston, Texas)
Mayors of Houston
People from Baldwinsville, New York